Vankal may refer to:

 Vankal, Champhai, a village in Mizoram, India
 Vankal, Surat, a locality in Gujarat, India